is a train station in the town of Tateyama, Nakaniikawa District, Toyama Prefecture, Japan.

Lines

Station layout 
The station has one ground-level side platform serving a single bi-directional track. The station is unattended.

History
It was renamed to its present name in 1937.

Adjacent stations

Surrounding area 
The station is located in a rural area surrounded by fields.

See also
 List of railway stations in Japan

External links

 

Railway stations in Toyama Prefecture
Railway stations in Japan opened in 1931
Stations of Toyama Chihō Railway
Tateyama, Toyama